Women's strike may refer to: 
 Women's Strike for Equality (1970)
 1975 Icelandic women's strike
 All-Poland Women's Strike - Strajk kobiet (since 2016)
 International Women's Strike (2017)
 Day Without a Woman (2017)
 2018 Spanish women's strike
 2019 Swiss women's strike
 Global Women's Strike
 Women Strike for Peace

See also 
 Sex strike
 Women's March